Goreljek ( or ) is a high-elevation settlement on the Pokljuka Plateau in the Municipality of Bohinj in the Upper Carniola region of Slovenia. It has less than ten residents, but there are a large number of holiday homes in Goreljek and its immediate area. The northern part of the settlement's territory extends into the Ore Valley. The local chapel is dedicated to Saint Anthony the Hermit and was rebuilt in a modern alpine style in 1996.

History
Goreljek was first attested in written sources as Gorellegk in 1494, and it was originally a mountain pasture belonging to the village of Koprivnik v Bohinju. During the Second World War, German forces surrounded and destroyed most of the 3rd Battalion of the Partisans' Prešeren Brigade at Goreljek on December 15, 1943.

References

External links 

Goreljek at Geopedia

Populated places in the Municipality of Bohinj